The following elections occurred in the year 1865.

Africa

Libera
 1865 Liberian general election

Europe

Denmark
 1865 Danish Folketing election

Greece
 1865 Greek legislative election

Hungary
 1865 Hungarian parliamentary election

Italy
 1865 Italian general election

Malta
 1865 Maltese general election

Norway
1865 Norwegian parliamentary election

Portugal
1865 Portuguese legislative election

United Kingdom
 1865 United Kingdom general election

North America

Canada
 1865 Newfoundland general election

United States
 1865 New York state election
 1865 South Carolina gubernatorial election

South America

Ecuador
1865 Ecuadorian presidential election

Peru
1865 Peruvian presidential referendum

See also
 :Category:1865 elections

1865
Elections